This is a list of years in Kenya.

Before European colonization 
BCE in East Africa
Early CE in East Africa
13th century
14th century

Colonization 
15th century
16th century

Republic of Kenya

See also 
 Timeline of Kenya
 Timelines of cities in Kenya: Mombasa, Nairobi

 
Kenya history-related lists
Kenya